Paride Grillo (born 23 March 1982, in Varese) is an Italian former professional road bicycle racer. He rode in two editions of the Giro d'Italia, and finished 2nd on stage 12 of the 2005 edition.

Major results 

2002
 2nd Trofeo Franco Balestra
 5th Circuito del Porto
2003
 1st Trofeo Pina e Mario Bazzigallupi
 6th Circuito del Porto
 6th Gran Premio della Liberazione
2004
 1st Trofeo Franco Balestra
 3rd Circuito del Porto
2005
 1st Stage 5 Circuit de Lorraine
 1st Stage 4 Post Danmark Rundt
 2nd Gran Premio Città di Misano – Adriatico
 2nd Memorial Cimurri
 2nd Giro della Provincia di Lucca
 3rd Giro del Piemonte
 3rd Gran Premio Bruno Beghelli
 4th GP Costa degli Etruschi
 4th Giro di Romagna
 8th Overall Tour Down Under
2006
 1st GP de la Ville de Rennes
 1st Stage 2a Circuit Cycliste de la Sarthe
 1st Stage 4 Brixia Tour
 3rd Gran Premio Città di Misano – Adriatico
 4th Giro della Provincia di Lucca
 9th Giro del Piemonte
2007
 1st Stage 2 Circuit Cycliste de la Sarthe
 1st Stages 1 & 7 Volta a Portugal
 2nd Gran Premio Città di Misano – Adriatico
 2nd Coppa Bernocchi
2008
 6th Giro di Toscana

External links 

Italian male cyclists
Cyclists from Varese
1982 births
Living people